This is a list of the 50 members of the European Parliament for Spain in the 2009 to 2014 session. Two people from Socialist Workers' Party, one from Coalition for Europe and one from People's Party entered the Parliament in December 2011, bringing the number of Spanish MEPs back to 54.

List

See also
 Members of the European Parliament 2009–2014
 List of members of the European Parliament, 2009–2014 - for a full alphabetical list
 2009 European Parliament election

References 

Spain
List
2009